James Corbette Edwards (December 14, 1894 – January 19, 1965) was a pitcher in Major League Baseball who played for   different teams between the  and  seasons.

A native of Banner, Mississippi, Edwards attended Mississippi College and played college baseball there. After graduating in April 1922, the Cleveland Indians signed him to a contract and immediately placed him on the major league roster. He made his debut on May 14, and in 25 games he had a 3–8 win–loss record and a 4.47 earned run average (ERA). In 1923, he spent some time as a starting pitcher and some as a relief pitcher. In 38 games, 21 of them starts, he had a 10–10 record and a 3.71 ERA in 179.1 innings pitched.

In 1924, Edwards pitched in 10 games for the Indians, and had a 4–3 record and a 2.84 ERA. After 13 games and an ERA of 8.25 the following season, he was released and picked up by the Chicago White Sox, pitching in nine games towards the end of the season. Edwards spent the 1926 season with the White Sox, and had a 6–9 record and a 4.18 ERA in 32 games, 16 of them starts. In 1927, he had his first taste of minor league baseball, and spent the year with the Seattle Indians. In 41 games for them, he had a 20–17 record and a 3.36 ERA. The following season he had a 1–8 record and a 3.14 ERA in ten games. The Cincinnati Reds signed him to a contract during part of the 1928 season, and in his last season in the majors, he had a 2–2 record and a 7.59 ERA in 18 appearances. He then spent four more seasons in the minor leagues to end his professional career. In a six-season career, Edwards posted a 26–37 record with 211 strikeouts and a 4.37 ERA in 145 appearances, including 59 starts, 23 complete games, six shutouts, four saves, and  innings of work.

After retiring, Edwards moved to Pontotoc, Mississippi and became a teacher and football coach. He died in Sarepta, Mississippi, at the age of 70 from a car accident.

References

External links

Retrosheet

1894 births
1965 deaths
Chicago White Sox players
Cincinnati Reds players
Cleveland Indians players
Major League Baseball pitchers
Mississippi College Choctaws baseball players
Road incident deaths in Mississippi
Baseball players from Mississippi
Seattle Indians players
Oakland Oaks (baseball) players
Birmingham Barons players
Knoxville Smokies players
Memphis Chickasaws players